Ramaria fennica, commonly known as the bitter coral, is a coral mushroom in the family Gomphaceae. It is found in Australia, Europe and North America.

Taxonomy
Petter Karsten first described the species in 1868 under the name Clavaria fennica, based on collections made in Finnish fir woods. Adalbert Ricken transferred it to the genus Ramaria in 1920.

The specific epithet fennica refers to Finland, where the original collections were made. It is commonly known as the "bitter coral".

Description
Unlike many larger Ramarias, R. fennica fruits bodies are usually taller than they are wide. The surface of the branches is smooth, and they can range in color from olive-grey to olive-umber to smokey-yellow, grayish-tan, or yellow brown. The primary branches are darker–olive-brown tinged with violet in young specimens. The thick and fleshy stalk is white below, with color becoming the same as the branch color in the upper part of the stem. The flesh is white, firm, and brittle.

Ramaria fennica produces a pale yellowish-tan spore print. Spores are elliptical, covered with tiny spines, and measure 5.5–8 by 3–4.5 μm.

The edibility of the coral is not known with certainty, but its sometimes bitter taste and thin flesh make it unappealing.

Similar species
Ramaria fumiosiavellanea is similar in coloration, but has a much reduced stem.

Habitat and distribution
Fruit bodies grow on the ground singly, scattered, or in groups, often with tanoak (in North America). A generally uncommon species, it sometimes fruits prolifically. It is also known from Europe and Australia.

References

External links

Gomphaceae
Fungi described in 1868
Fungi of Australia
Fungi of Europe
Fungi of North America
Taxa named by Petter Adolf Karsten